Memphis Power Pro Wrestling (Power Pro Wrestling) was a Memphis, Tennessee based professional wrestling promotion that was founded by Randy Hales. It was affiliated with Memphis Championship Wrestling and World Wrestling Federation. It was the first developmental territory for the World Wrestling Federation. The roster featured WWF-contracted wrestlers sent for training and experience like Kurt Angle and Matt Bloom (Tensai/Albert), Daniel Bryan and Memphis wrestling legends Bill Dundee and Jerry Lawler, Brian Christopher and many others.

It operated from April 1998 to April 2001. The promotion was booked by Randy Hales and Brandon Baxter.

Alumni

Male wrestlers

Female wrestlers

Stables and tag teams

Managers and valets

Commentators and interviewers

Other personnel

Championships

Power Pro Wrestling Heavyweight Championship 
The PPW Heavyweight Championship was the top title contested for in the Power Pro Wrestling (later Memphis Power Pro Wrestling).

Power Pro Wrestling Tag Team Championship 
The PPW Tag Team Championship was a title contended for in the Power Pro Wrestling later Memphis Power Pro Wrestling promotion.

Power Pro Wrestling Television Championship 
The PPW Television title was a secondary championship contested for in Power Pro Wrestling/Memphis Power Pro Wrestling.

Power Pro Wrestling Young Guns Championship 
The PPW Young Guns title was a secondary championship contested for in Power Pro Wrestling/Memphis Power Pro Wrestling.

Power Pro Wrestling Hardcore Championship 
The PPW Hardcore title was a secondary championship contested for in Power Pro Wrestling/Memphis Power Pro Wrestling.

See also

List of independent wrestling promotions in the United States

References

Independent professional wrestling promotions based in Tennessee
Sports in Memphis, Tennessee